Sahaya is a 2019 Philippine television drama fantasy series broadcast by GMA Network. It premiered on the network's Telebabad line up and worldwide on GMA Pinoy TV on March 18, 2019 to September 6, 2019 replacing Onanay.

NUTAM (Nationwide Urban Television Audience Measurement) People in Television Homes ratings are provided by AGB Nielsen Philippines. The series ended, but its the 24th-week run, and with a total of 122 episodes. It was replaced by Beautiful Justice.

Series overview

Episodes

March 2019

April 2019

May 2019

June 2019

July 2019

August 2019

September 2019

Episodes notes

References

Lists of Philippine drama television series episodes